The 2019–20 Southeastern Louisiana Lady Lions basketball team represents Southeastern Louisiana University during the 2019–20 NCAA Division I women's basketball season. The Lady Lions are led by third year head coach Ayla Guzzardo, and play their home games at the University Center as members of the Southland Conference.

Previous season
The Lady Lions finished the season 9–20, 4–14 in Southland play to finish in a tie for last place. They failed to qualify for the Southland women's tournament.

Roster
Sources:

Schedule
Source

|-
!colspan=9 style=| Exhibition season

|-
!colspan=9 style=| Non-conference regular season

|-
!colspan=9 style=| Southland Conference regular season

|-
!colspan=9 style=| Non-conference regular season

|-
!colspan=9 style=| Southland Conference regular season

|-
!colspan=12 style=| 2020 Hercules Tires Southland Basketball Tournament
|-

See also
2019–20 Southeastern Louisiana Lions basketball team

References

Southeastern Louisiana Lady Lions basketball seasons
Southeastern Louisiana
Southeastern Louisiana
Southeastern Louisiana